Josh Boileau (born 2 July 1995 in Newbridge, County Kildare) is a former Irish professional snooker player. He is the 2016 Under-21 European Snooker Champion.

Career
In 2014 Boileau entered the EBSA European Under-21 Snooker Championships in Bucharest where he reached the final, before he lost 6–1 Oliver Lines. Two years following his disappointment in Bucharest, Boileau once again made it to the final where he defeated Brandon Sargeant 6–1 to win the 2016 EBSA European Under-21 Snooker Championship, as a result he was given a two-year card on the professional World Snooker Tour for the 2016–17 and 2017–18 seasons. His first win at the venue stage of a ranking event was at the Northern Ireland Open when he edged past Mike Dunn 4–3. Boileau then saw off Hamza Akbar 4–2, before losing 4–1 to Kurt Maflin. He overcame Hammad Miah 4–1 at the Welsh Open to set up a second round meeting with Shaun Murphy, who Boileau said inspired him to start playing snooker after he watched him win the World Championship in 2005. Boileau beat the world number six 4–2, but then lost 4–0 to Robert Milkins.

Performance and rankings timeline

Career finals

Amateur finals: 4 (1 title)

References

External links

Josh Boileau at worldsnooker.com
Josh Boileau at CueTracker.net: Snooker Results and Statistic Database

Irish snooker players
Living people
1995 births
Sportspeople from County Kildare